Natiq Hashim Abid-Aoun (15 January 1960 – 26 September 2004) was an Iraqi football midfielder who played for Iraq in the 1986 FIFA World Cup. He also played for Al-Quwa Al-Jawiya.

Natiq started his career at Amana youth team in Baghdad alongside the likes of Basim Qasim, Anad Abid, Basil Gorgis and Karim Allawi.

In 1982, Natiq was given his international debut by Yugoslavian coach Vojo Gardesevic after his displays for both the Iraqi youth team and Amana. A year later he joined Al-Quwa Al-Jawiya then Al-Jaish before moving to Al-Rasheed, who had many internationals in their side such as Ahmed Radhi, Adnan Dirjal and Haris Mohammed.

He participated at the 1984 Olympics in Los Angeles, against Canada, Cameroon and Yugoslavia and the 1988 Olympics in Seoul, where he played one game against Zambia. Natiq also played in all the 1986 World Cup games in Mexico in central midfield alongside his former Amana teammates Basil Gorgis, Anad Abid and Basim Qasim.

He died of a heart attack in 2004 in Muscat, where he was coaching a first division club.

Career statistics

International goals
Scores and results list Iraq's goal tally first.

References

External links
 FIFA profile

1960 births
Sportspeople from Baghdad
Iraqi footballers
Iraq international footballers
Association football midfielders
Al-Quwa Al-Jawiya players
1986 FIFA World Cup players
2004 deaths
Olympic footballers of Iraq
Footballers at the 1984 Summer Olympics
Footballers at the 1988 Summer Olympics
Asian Games medalists in football
Footballers at the 1982 Asian Games
Asian Games gold medalists for Iraq
Medalists at the 1982 Asian Games
Al-Quwa Al-Jawiya managers
Iraqi football managers
Deaths in Oman